Dmitri Andreyevich Sasin (born 21 August 1996) is a Russian football player who plays for Akron Tolyatti.

Club career
He made his professional debut in the Russian Professional Football League for FC Tom-2 Tomsk on 19 July 2014 in a game against FC Yakutiya Yakutsk.

He made his Russian Premier League debut for FC Tom Tomsk on 3 March 2017 in a game against FC Rostov.

References

External links
 
 
 

1996 births
Living people
Russian footballers
People from Kemerovo
Sportspeople from Kemerovo Oblast
Association football midfielders
FC Tom Tomsk players
FC Slutsk players
FC Akron Tolyatti players
Russian Premier League players
Russian First League players
Russian Second League players
Belarusian Premier League players
Russian expatriate footballers
Expatriate footballers in Belarus
Russian expatriate sportspeople in Belarus